Talana is a village 5 km east of Dundee on the route between Vryheid and Glencoe. The name is Zulu and derives from the shelf, made of itala grass, around the central pole in a Zulu chief's home. Amulets, precious items and valuables were placed on this Talana Shelf. Hence the name means "the place where treasures are kept."

."  Talana Hill is a flat-topped hill and was the scene of the famous Battle of Talana Hill on 20 October 1899, between the Boers and the British.

References

Populated places in the Endumeni Local Municipality